Jay Bergman (born February 6, 1939) is a former American college baseball coach.  During his coaching career he served as the head coach of Seminole Community College, University of Florida and the University of Central Florida.  Jay Bergman Field on the campus of the University of Central Florida was named for him.

Bergman was forced out at UCF with 10 games left in the 2008 season after being accused of harassing an equipment manager.  He was originally fired, but reached a settlement that allowed him to retire. Terry Rooney, the pitching coach at LSU, was hired to replace him.

Bergman finished his thirty-six season career as a head coach with an overall record of 1,183 wins, 688 losses, and 3 ties, and a winning percentage of .632.  In the early 2000s, he won three A-Sun Coach of the Year awards.

See also 

 List of college baseball coaches with 1,100 wins

References 

1939 births
Living people
Florida Gators baseball coaches
Sportspeople from Winter Park, Florida
UCF Knights baseball coaches